is a Japanese footballer who plays as a defensive midfielder for Yokohama F. Marinos and the Japan national team.

Personal life
Born in Tokyo. His father is Nigerian and his mother is Japanese.

Career statistics

Club
.

Honours

Club
Yokohama F. Marinos
 J1 League: 2022

References

External links

2002 births
Living people
Association football people from Tokyo
Japanese people of Nigerian descent
Sportspeople of Nigerian descent
Japanese footballers
Japan youth international footballers
Association football midfielders
J2 League players
J1 League players
Tokyo Verdy players
Tokushima Vortis players
Yokohama F. Marinos players